What Happened to Jones may refer to:
 What Happened to Jones (1897 play), a play by George Broadhurst
 What Happened to Jones (1915 film), a lost silent film
 What Happened to Jones (1920 film), a lost silent film
 What Happened to Jones (1926 film), a silent film comedy